The 2007 Real Salt Lake season was the third season of the team's existence.  After seeing slight improvement in 2006, the team struggled again under manager John Ellinger, opening the 2007 campaign with a 0-2-2 record.  Ownership made a drastic move on May 3, firing Ellinger, and announcing that team captain (Jason Kreis), would retire and become the new head coach. RSL tied its next two matches against New York Red Bulls and the Colorado Rapids, but saw limited success the rest of the season. RSL finished the year with the league's second-worst record, ahead of expansion team Toronto FC.

The 2007 season also saw construction of its new soccer-specific stadium in Sandy, Utah continue. Additionally, under Kreis' management, the team undertook a massive roster overhaul that essentially rebuilt the squad. Among the new players that arrives in 2007, many would go on to comprise the core of the team for several years, including, Kyle Beckerman (soon-to-be captain), Chris Wingert, Robbie Findley, Fabián Espíndola, and Javier Morales. At the center of the remake was Kreis' new team philosophy of "The Team is the Star", and a new primary formation (possession-oriented, diamond midfield).

Also vital to the growth of the club was the hiring of the team's second general manager, Garth Lagerwey, on September 19. Lagerwey, a former MLS goalkeeper, was a teammate of Kreis' at Duke University and Dallas Burn. The two proved to be a great tandem which led to future player acquisitions for the team within the next year including Will Johnson, Robbie Russell, Nat Borchers, and Jámison Olave.

Real Salt Lake finished the season on October 20 with a 1-0 win over Colorado. In an otherwise disappointing year, the win secured RSL's first ever Rocky Mountain Cup victory. The team finished with a record of 6-15-9 and a -14 goal differential, placing last in the Western Conference.

Squad

2007 roster 

  † Promoted to head coach on May 3
 †† Saw no First Team minutes in 2007

Mid-Season Transfers 

Due to the termination of John Ellinger as head coach and the subsequent promotion of Jason Kreis in early May, there were an abnormal number of mid-season transactions for the club. The players listed in the roster section above include those acquired during this makeover. Below are names of players acquired, traded, transferred, or released by the team after the May 3rd hiring of Kreis in chronological order:

  Jeff Cunningham - Traded to Toronto FC for Alecko Eskandarian on May 22nd
  Luis Tejada - Released by club in June
  Daniel Torres - Transferred to Bryne F.K. in June 
  Chris Klein Traded to Los Angeles Galaxy for Robbie Findley and Nathan Sturgis on June 21st
  Chris Wingert - Acquired from Colorado Rapids on July 13th 
  Mehdi Ballouchy - Traded to Colorado Rapids for Kyle Beckerman in July
  Freddy Adu - Transferred to Benfica on July 30th 
  Fabián Espíndola - Acquired in August
  Javier Morales - Acquired in August
  Matias Mantilla - Acquired in August
  Yura Movsisyan - Acquired from Kansas City Wizards in September

Competitions

Major League Soccer

League table

Western Conference

Overall

Results summary

Regular season

April

May

June

July

August

September

October

Other matches and friendlies

References 

Real Salt Lake seasons
Utes